There have been four baronetcies created for people with the surname Samuel, all in the Baronetage of the United Kingdom. Two of the titles are still extant.

The Samuel baronetcy, of Nevern Square, St Mary Abbots parish, Kensington, in the County of London, was created in the Baronetage of the United Kingdom on 8 March 1898 for Saul Samuel, Agent-General for New South Wales in the United Kingdom.

The Samuel baronetcy, of The Mote and Portland Place, was created in the Baronetage of the United Kingdom on 26 August 1903 for the businessman Marcus Samuel. He was later elevated to the peerage as Baron Bearsted and promoted further to Viscount Bearsted in 1925. For more information, see this title.

The Samuel baronetcy, of Chelwood Vetchery in the County of Sussex, was created in the Baronetage of the United Kingdom on 8 July 1912 for the Liberal politician Stuart Samuel. He had previously represented Whitechapel in the House of Commons. Samuel was the elder brother of Herbert Samuel, 1st Viscount Samuel, the nephew of Samuel Montagu, 1st Baron Swaythling, and the cousin of Edwin Samuel Montagu. The title became extinct on his death in 1926.

The Samuel baronetcy, of Mancroft in the City of Norwich, was created in the Baronetage of the United Kingdom on 16 January 1932 for the Conservative politician Arthur Samuel, 1st Baron Mancroft. He was later elevated to the peerage as Baron Mancroft in 1937. For more information, see this title.

Samuel baronets, of Nevern Square (1898)
Sir Saul Samuel, 1st Baronet (1820–1900)
Sir Edward Levien Samuel, 2nd Baronet (1868–1937)
Sir Edward Louis Samuel, 3rd Baronet (1896–1961)
Sir John Oliver Cecil Samuel, 4th Baronet (1916–1962)
Sir John Michael Glen Samuel, 5th Baronet (born 1944)

Samuel baronets, of The Mote and Portland Place (1903)
see Viscount Bearsted

Samuel baronets, of Chelwood Vachery (1912)
Sir Stuart Montagu Samuel, 1st Baronet (1856–1926)

Samuel baronets, of Mancroft (1932)
see Baron Mancroft

See also
Viscount Samuel
Baron Swaythling
Baron Mancroft

References
Kidd, Charles, Williamson, David (editors). Debrett's Peerage and Baronetage (1990 edition). New York: St Martin's Press, 1990.

Baronetcies in the Baronetage of the United Kingdom
Extinct baronetcies in the Baronetage of the United Kingdom